The FIS Nordic World Ski Championships 1926 took place between February 4–6, 1926 in Lahti, Finland.

Men's cross country

30 km 
February 4, 1926

18 km was replaced by 30 km, but returned the following year. 30 km would not return to the championships again until 1954 when the 18 km event was shortened to 15 km. 15 of the 21 skiers finished the event.

50 km 
February 6, 1926

The conditions during these championships were extremely rough, with a temperature of −30 °C (−22 °F). In the 50 km, the top finishers used plastered masks for protection to their face. 14 of the 19 skiers finished the event.

Men's Nordic combined

Individual 
February 4, 1926

Grøttumsbråten had the fastest time in the cross country portion of the event, finishing three minutes ahead of Haug. Jacob Tullin Thams of Norway had the longest jump of the competition with a distance of 39.5 meters.

Men's ski jumping

Individual large hill 
February 4, 1926

20 of the 28 jumpers completed this event. Thams had the longest jump in the competition with a distance of 38.5 meters. Some sources have the points 18.980, 18.860 and 18.000 for the top 3, according to the format used 1924-1928

Medal table

References
results from German Wikipedia
1926 World Championship results from the Lahti City Museum  
FIS 1926 Cross country results
FIS 1926 Nordic combined results
FIS 1926 Ski jumping results

FIS Nordic World Ski Championships
Nordic Skiing
1926 in Nordic combined
1926 in Finnish sport
February 1926 sports events
Nordic skiing competitions in Finland
Sports competitions in Lahti